Tufanbeyli power station is a 450 MW coal-fired power station in Turkey in Tufanbeyli, built in the 2010s, which burns lignite mined locally. The plant is 40% owned by Sabancı Holding via Enerjisa Enerji and 40% by E.ON and in 2022 received capacity payments.

References

External links 

 Tufanbeyli power station on Global Energy Monitor

Coal-fired power stations in Turkey